Fort Island may refer to:
 Fort Delaware State Park, a river island in Delaware.
 St Michael's Isle, an island which is part of the Isle of Man.
 Fort Island, Guyana, a river island in Guyana.